P. superba may refer to:
 Pangio superba, a ray-finned fish species
 Powelliphanta superba, a land snail species endemic to New Zealand

See also 
 Superba (disambiguation)